The Wachau is an Austrian valley with a picturesque landscape formed by the Danube river. It is one of the most prominent tourist destinations of Lower Austria, located midway between the towns of Melk and Krems that also attracts "connoisseurs and epicureans" for its high-quality wines. A well-known place and tourist attraction is Dürnstein, where King Richard I of England was held captive by Leopold V, Duke of Austria. The architectural elegance of its ancient monasteries (Melk Abbey and Göttweig Abbey), castles and ruins combined with the urban architecture of its towns and villages, and the cultivation of vines as an important agricultural produce are the dominant features of the valley.

The Wachau was inscribed as "Wachau Cultural Landscape" in the UNESCO List of World Heritage Sites in recognition of its architectural and agricultural history, in December 2000.

History

Ancient history
Even before the Neolithic period brought in changes in the natural environment of the valley, Palaeolithic's records of the valley have been identified in the form of "figurines" in  Galgenberg and Willendorf  stated to be  32,000 years and 26,000 years old respectively that testify to human occupation in the valley. It has been inferred that Krems and Melk were well settled establishments in the early Neolithic period between 4500 BCE and 1800 BCE Wachau Valley's ancient history in the Neolithic period started with deforestation by the people of the land for cultivation and settlement.

In 15 BCE, the Celtic kingdom of Noricum became part of the Roman Empire. Since then the Empire's boundaries were made up along the Danube also in Wachau and the fortifications of the limes were built along its southern banks, especially Castrum Favianis (what is now Mautern an der Donau) at the downstream end of the valley and some burgi (i.e. small watchtower-like fortresses) in the area of Rossatz-Arnsdorf municipality, the remains of which can still be seen today, most notably in Bacharnsdorf. Roman rule on the southern banks of the Danube came to an end when King Odoaker ordered the evacuation of the Latin speaking population in 488 CE.

The name "wachu"  as such was recorded as "locus Wahowa" in 853 AD and the name of "Krems" was recorded as Urbs Chremisa in 995 CE, marking it as the oldest Austrian town.

The Babenberg Margraves, with Leopold I as their first king, ruled in Wachau from 976 CE. The 11th century marked an Austrian dukedom of Babenberg under Henry I, in 1156; it came under the great knightly family of the Wachau, the Kuenrings and later  passed on to the Babenberg. With the dissipation of this line of rule, Duke Albrecht V (King Albrecht II) came to power in 1430. Between 1150 and 1839 CE the four towns of St Michael, Wösendorf, Joching, and Weissenkirchen functioned independently. However, they formed a single entity as Wachau or Tal Wachau only in 1972. An interesting part of the 12th-century history is the imprisonment of Richard the Lionhearted, the King of England at the Kuenringerburg castle (now in ruins) above the Dürnstein town for the reason that he insulted the Babenberg Duke, Leopold V by showing disrespect to the Austrian flag (he had thrown it into a drain). Even though he was travelling in Austria (returning from the Holy Lands) in disguise (he had grown a beard to escape detection), he was identified in an inn in Erdberg, now a suburb of Vienna. He was finally released after paying a kingly ransom of 35,000 kg of silver. According to myth, the king's freedom was facilitated due to the efforts of his French aide Blondel. It is said that this silver booty was used to build Wiener Neustadt.

Between 1150 and 1839, the four towns of St. Michael, Wösendorf, Joching and Weissenkirchen functioned independently. However, they formed a single entity as Wachau or Tal Wachau only in 1972. Wachau also had its fair share of invasions. The Hungarians invaded in the 15th century and Matthias Corvinus occupied Krems and Stein in 1477. Church Reformists' activities also made an impact between 1530 and 1620, with the Protestants finally getting subdued by the Göttweig Abbot Georg II Falb in 1612–31; eleven Austrian Benedictine abbeys had lent full support in this victory. This had a profound impact on the religious culture of the valley with many churches, chapels and other monuments being built in the valley.

Set in the Wachau and depicting the politics of the times, the epic German poem "Nibelungenlied" was written around 1200 CE,  Fragments of this epic was discovered in the monastic library of Melk, which are also displayed there.

However, substantial changes in the landscape were witnessed during medieval period from the 9th century with establishment of the Bavarian and Salzburg monasteries. During this process of development, economic needs necessitated creation of vine terraces to manufacture and market wine. In the 17th century, the area brought under vineyards varied widely depending on the climate and also the marketability of its wine. Viticulture on the hill slopes was practiced from the 18th century but adjustments in acreage brought under viticulture and pasture, and viticulture and horticulture (fruits) became necessary to meet the economic conditions in the region. Concurrent with this, the country side also started developing and this closely affected the agricultural practices in the region.

History of development of towns in the valley is traced to the 11th and 12th centuries. This development, which was of a homogeneous character with wooden buildings built for housing in irregularly shaped streets are seen even to this day. However, stone as building material was introduced in the 15th and 16th centuries to replace the old wooden structures by the peasants and the burghers. Since 1950, the residential complexes have appeared in the upper periphery of the valley.

A notable feature of the valley is the layout of the winegrowers' farmsteads. They are basically laid in "oblong or U shape or L-shape" with two parallel set of buildings. The farmsteads also have the usual gated walls, facades, service buildings and vaulted passages, which over the centuries have been modified. Baroque architecture is a dominant feature with the street fronts depicting "late-medieval/post-medieval oriels on sturdy brackets, statues in niches, wall paintings and sgraffito work, or remnants of paintwork or rich Baroque facades." The architectural features of the roof of the Wachau house comprise a sharp slope with soaring hipped roof.

Modern history
From 1700 onwards (considered under the modern period) many renovation works were undertaken. These included the Melk Abbey rebuilt in 1702, the refurbishing of the Canons' Abbey in Dürnstein between 1715 and 1733 and major reconstruction works of Göttweig Abbey that began in 1719. However, in the late 18th and 19th centuries, there was a decline in its importance as a result of closure of monasteries under the secular rule of the Bavarians. However, many events changed the situation with all local communities between Krems and Melk coming together to ensure economic development of the Wachau, since 1904, duly integrating historical legacy with modernity. Tourism and vineyards development protected by Government Laws are now the byword for the  "Golden Wachau," as it is now nicknamed.

In the modern period though, the 18th-century buildings are now integrated with the town layout, and they are used for promotion of trade and crafts. The 15th and 16th centuries' ambiance is witnessed in the "towns' taverns or inns, stations for changing draught horses, boat operators' and toll houses, mills, smithies, or salt storehouses". The valley and the towns, still preserve a number of castles of vintage value.

The Wachau was inscribed as "Wachau Cultural Landscape" in the UNESCO List of World Heritage Sites in December 2000 under category (ii) for its riverine landscape and under category (iv) for the medieval landscape that depicts architectural monuments, human settlements, and the agricultural use of its land. Even prior to the UNESCO recognition, on September 5, 1994, the Wachau area was officially brought under the ambit of the "Natura 2000", a network of European sites of the European Union, to ensure that development in the designated areas follow all rules and regulations. The designated area has 5000 historic monuments, though most of them are privately owned. However, the Federal Office of Historic Monuments (they also maintain a complete list of all historic monuments in Austria) and the Landeskonservatorat für Niederösterreich are responsible for the conservation of the historic cultural landscape of the Wachau.

Geography

The Danube valley in Austria between the cities of Melk and Krems in Lower Austria is called the Wachau. This stretch of the valley includes the hills and the adjacent Dunkelsteiner Wald (Dunkelsteiner Forest) and the southern Waldviertel.  The Danube river flows north-northeast from Melk to Dürnstein through a meander from which it flows southeast, then east past the city of Krems. In the Wachau, the town of Spitz lies on the Danube's western bank and the city of Melk on its eastern bank. Other important towns in the valley are Dürnstein, Weißenkirchen in der Wachau and Emmersdorf an der Donau, which have a galaxy of old homestead buildings dating from the mid-6th century. The railway line built in 1909 between Krems and Emmersdorf is a topographical marvel. Other settlements of note in the Wachau valley include Aggsbach, Bachamsdorf, Bergern im Dunkelsteinerwald, Furth bei Göttweig, Joching, Maria Laach am Jauerling, Mautern an der Donau, Mühldorf, Oberamsdorf, Oberloiben, Rossatz-Arnsdorf, Ruhrsdorf, Schwallenbach, Schönbühel-Aggsbach, Unterloiben and Willendorf.

The Danube River has a good network consisting of an inland navigation system. The Wachau valley historic sights can be visited by steamer boats; the best season to visit is between May and September. Autobahn services are also available from Vienna to visit all the important places in the Wachau. The well-developed road network between Melk and Krems follows the contour of the valley. However, there are no bridges across the Danube River in this region, and ferries are the only way to cross the river.

Melk

An ancient town with its historicity linked to the Romans (as a border post) and also to Babenbergs' times (as their strong fortress), known then as the Namare Fort, which the residents call as the Medelke of the Nibenlunggenlied or the Babenberg fortress. Its present population is reported to be 5300. There is baroque gateway at the entrance.

The basic layout of the town below the Abbey is dated to the 11th and 12th centuries. However, many of the present day historic buildings in the main streets of the town are from 16th to 18th century. The most prominent streets laid out from the town hall square (Rathausplatz) are the Hauptstrasse (the main street) and Sterngasse, which is oldest street of the town. Some notable buildings seen in these streets and the square are: The former Lebzelterhaus dated to 1657, now a pharmacy and the Rathaus, dated to 1575, which has a large entrance door made of wood and copper, both in the Rathausplatz square; and an over-four-hundred-year-old bakery with shingle roof. A well-conserved ancient grapevine groove is located next to the Haus am Stein behind the Sterngasse. The Danube River bank shows marks of past flood levels at the shipping master's house. Also of interest is the old post office building of 1792, established by the then-postmaster Freiher von Furnberg; this functions now as a convention centre. Another dominant feature in the town is the Birago Barracks, built during 1910–13. In the peripheral area of the town, buildings built in the latter half of the 19th century and early 20th century are seen in their original condition. However, a district of villas replicating the Wiener Cottage Verein can also be seen here now. A1 Autobahn between Vienna and Salzburg has a station close to the town centre. Melk also has many cycle trails, which are popular.

Krems

Krems, which includes the town of Stein, an old town located between Kremser Tor (15th century) and Gottweigerghof (13th and 14th century) has many historical buildings, and also "pedestrian only" streets of Obere and Untere Landstrasse. From historical times, Krems has been popular for wine trade due to its terraced vineyards. The Minorite Church was the parish church in the old town, and is now used to hold art exhibitions. Apart from this Gothic church, the town also has the Pfarrkirche St. Nikolaus Church that depicts paintings on the altar and the ceiling, which are credited to the famous painter Kremser Schmidt, who lived in Linzer Tor from 1756 until his death. He was the leading painter, draughtsman and etcher of the Austrian late Baroque. Ancient records of 1263 CE make mention of a payment of 10% tax by the farmers to the Bishop of Passau's Zehenthof. Other monuments in Mauthaus town are a Renaissance building and the Baroque palace, built in 1721, which is known as the birthplace of Ludwig von Köchel, who did research on Mozart. A medieval gate erected in 1480, known as the Steiner Tor, is another notable feature.

Spitz

Spitz is a small town with cobbled streets amidst vineyards and views of the Danube valley. Occupied since Celtic times, it was first mentioned in 830. To the south of Spitz is the fortress of Hinterhaus.

Dürnstein

The town of Dürnstein was established in 1019 CE on a rocky promontory along a gentle curve of the Danube river, in the midst of the Wachau valley. It is 73 km upstream of Vienna. It now has a population of 936. The town is also well known for some of the residential buildings on the main street; one such building is the refurbished building of Chorherrenstift, which was originally a monastery built in 1410. It was restored in the 18th century.

Chronologically, the historical legacies associated with the town are as follows: imprisonment of the English King Richard the Lionheart in the Kuenringer Castle (now seen in ruins) from December 1192 to March 1193; the conquest by the Babenberg Duke Frederic II over the rebels of the Kuenring in 1231; building of the St. Kunigunde church in 1231; construction of the town hall (which was later modified in Renaissance style in 1547) with towers and gates between 13th and 14th centuries; recognition as a town in 1347; end of the dynastic rule of Dürnstein by the Kuenrings in 1355; the Habsburgs acquisition of Dürnstein as sovereigns under the rule of Duke Albrecht III of Austria in 1356; establishing the monastery of the Order of St. Augustine – "Augustiner-Chorherren" – and the gothic monastery between 1410 and 1440; Emperor Frederic III awarding the municipal coat of arms to the town in 1476; dissolution of the order of St. Clara's nunnery (built in 1330) and its control delegated to the Augustinian monks in 1571; the 16th century construction of residential buildings in a unique style, which continue to be recognized for their distinct artistic value to this day; building of a new castle in 1630; construction of the baroque monastery between 1710 and 1740; construction of the Wine Cellar Castle or the Keller-Schlößl in 1714; dissolution of the Augustinian monastery by Emperor Joseph II in 1788; battling the French invasion November 11, 1805 (Napoleonic Wars known as the Battle of Dürenstein fought in the flood plains between the river and the mountains in the river section which is curved in the shape of a crescent between Dürnstein and nearby Krems an der Donau; the first city mayor's election in 1850; inauguration of the railway line along the Danube in 1909; refurbishing of the baroque tower of the monastery and painting it in its original blue colour. The villages of Oberloiben, Unterloiben and Rothenhof, located to the east of Dürnstein on the road to Krems, are now under the jurisdiction of the town. Dürnstein is also famous for the bread known as Wachauer-Laberl, which is served in wine bars. It is round baked bread called Gebäck,  which is made from the flour of rye and wheat. The recipe for the bread is credited to the Schmidl family of Dürnstein, and is a closely guarded secret.

The wine-producing village is the Weissenkirchen,  from Dürnstein. It is a charming village with narrow cobbled streets, where the 16th-century Teisenhoferhof with arcaded courtyards are an attraction. It has a wine press from the 18th century and also a museum known as the Wachamuseum. 19th-century paintings of the Wachau's picturesque landscape, etchings known as Baechanalism and self-portraits and family  pictures, all done by Kremser Schmidt, are displayed in the museum.

Other towns

Other important places in the valley are:

Willendorf

Willendorf,  from Krems, is the place where the primitive naked statue called the "Venus of Willendorf" - made in chalkstone, 11 cm long - was discovered in 1908.  One of the preeminent examples of prehistoric art, it is widely considered to be a fertility goddess.  The statue is estimated to be 25,000 years old and is now on display at the Natural History Museum in Vienna; a replica is seen in the museum in Willendorf.

A postage stamp of Euro value 3.75 of the Venus von Willendorf was released on August 7, 2008 to mark the 100-year celebrations since the discovery of the Venus.

Artstetten-Pöbring

Artstetten-Pöbring is a small town in the Melk district most known for Artstetten Castle, which is noted for its many onion-shaped domes. The castle has been refurbished many times over the past 700 years. It is famous for the fact that the Archduke Franz Ferdinand was the former owner of the castle. A museum in the castle has pictures of the life history of "the one and only Duke" and his wife during their stay in the castle. The duke and his wife were assassinated during their visit to Sarajevo, which triggered World War I. The castle also houses their tomb.

Geology
The river valley's geological formation is mainly of crystalline rocks, interspersed with Tertiary and Quaternary deposits in the wider reaches of the valley, and also in the Spitzer Graben. The land formation in the valley is dictated by the clay and silt deposits around Weissenkirchen and at the beginning of the Wachau stretch. A major tributary, which joins the Danube in Wachau on its left bank, is the Spitzer Graben, which is stated to be " part of the primeval Danube." During the Tertiary period, the flow of this river was to the west of the Wachau, on its northern border. The course of the river seen now is from Spitz onwards. The river is flowing along a weak fault zone on the southern border of the Bohemian Massif.

Wine

The origin of the wine growing tradition in Austria, and in particular in the Wachau valley, and its popularity beyond its borders, is attributed to medieval period of the Roman settlements. The Vinea Wachau Nobilis Districts date to Leuthold I von Kuenring (1243–1313). Wine production peaked under the Carolingians. Krems has a long history as the hub of the Wachau wine trade, while the town of Dürnstein is also known for being one of the Wachau wine centres. Founded in 1983, the Vinea Wachau is an association of vintners who created categories for Wachau wine classification. The vintners of the Vinea Wachau claim to produce quality wine under a manifesto of six Vinea Wachau wine making laws, also known as six Wachau commandments. Their products, known for their purity, are labelled under the categories of Steinfeder, Federspiel or Smaragd.

The Wachau valley is well known for its production of apricots and grapes, both of which are used to produce specialty liquors and wines. The wine district's rolling vineyards produce complex white wines. Wachau is a source of Austria's most prized dry Rieslings and Grüner Veltliners, some of the best from the steep stony slopes next to the Danube on which the vines are planted. The temperature variation in the valley between day and cold nights has a significant role to play in the process of ripening of the grapes. The heat retained in the water and the stoney slopes with thin soil cover facilitates this process of growing fine variety of grapes, which results in the sophisticated wines produced in the valley. Since rainfall is not adequate for the growth of wines on thin soils, irrigation is an essential requirement to give water supply to the wine yards.

Historical monuments
The historical monuments in the Wachau valley are more than 5000. Some of them are: The Benedictine abbeys of Melk (Stift Melk a massive baroque Benedictine monastery) and Göttweig (a monastery of canons regular), at the beginning and end of the scenic Wachau section of the Danube Valley from where one gets a visual feast of the city of Melk; the Schallaburg Castle, a Renaissance style castle  from Melk; the Steiner Tor in Krems or Krems an der Donau, the late-Gothic Piarist church; Dürnstein for its wine growing area and the Durnstein castle; and the Burgruine Aggstein.

Melk Abbey

Melk Abbey or Stift Melk is a Benedictine abbey, and one of the world's most famous monastic sites. It is located above the town of Melk on a granite rocky outcrop at an elevation of  overlooking the river Danube in Lower Austria, adjoining the Wachau valley, about 40 km upstream of Krems.

The abbey was founded in 1089 CE when Leopold II, Margrave of Austria gave one of his castles to Benedictine monks from Lambach Abbey. Monks have lived here since then. A school was founded in the 12th century, and the monastic library soon became renowned for its extensive manuscript collection. The library has a collection of 100,000 books including manuscripts and 750 volumes printed prior to 1500 CE,  described as "incunabula." The monastery's scriptorium was also a major site for the production of manuscripts. In the 15th century, the abbey became the centre of the "Melk Reform movement" which reinvigorated the monastic life of Austria and Southern Germany.

Today's impressive Baroque abbey, seen painted in mustard yellow colour, was built between 1702 and 1736 to designs by Jakob Prandtauer commissioned by abbot Berthed Dietmayer against all odds faced by him from his fellow monks. As one of the "most significant and magnificent Baroque monasteries in all of Austria", this monument including Machau and others such as Krems and Gottweig are inscribed in UNESCO Heritage List.

The abbey complex has been built around seven courtyards and the main church, described as with its interior "baroque gone barmy with endless prancing angels and gold twirls", is oriented conforming to religious practices. The narrow west-facing wall of the Abbey is painted in rich original colour combination of bright yellow and white. The abbey has a horde of windows, at 1888 numbers to be exact. Particularly noteworthy is the abbey church with frescos (particularly providing a display of Apotheosis of St. Benedict) by Johann Michael Rottmayr dated 1722 and the impressive library with countless medieval manuscripts, including a famed collection of musical manuscripts and symbolic frescos of faith in the ceiling by Paul Troger (1731–32). The gallery known as the Kaisergang which is 190 m long provided access  to the 88 imperial rooms (Napoleon had stayed in one of these rooms); many of these rooms are now part of the museum.

The high altar and the cupola in the church are lighted by natural light, which appears very impressive. The transept in the church has the sarcophagus of St. Koloman. Other impressive features in the church are the statues of apostles Peter and Paul, painting on the ceiling of Holy Trinity flanked by several saints. A recent addition is an altar designed by H. Hunter and F. Frost which was built in 1976 incorporating Baroque interior. The marble hall (in red and grey colour), called the Marmorsaal, which comes after the library, also has baroque interior with marble used only for the door frames. However, this hall which was earlier the Royal dining hall now functions as a centre for formal ceremonies and receptions, and is also part of the museum. This hall has a fresco of Enlightenment made by Paul Troger. The balcony that connects the library and the marble hall provides exceptional views of the Wachu valley amidst the Danube River. The abbey also houses a very impressive museum where monastic treasures are displayed and information on the entire history of Austria is also narrated; an illustrative depiction of the "Melk Cross" of the late medieval period (14th century) is conserved (in the treasury) in the museum. This cross which is studded with precious gem stones such as aquamarine and pearls, along with two other treasures of the abbey namely, the portable altar of Swanhild of the 11th century that depicts life of Christ carved in walrus horn, and a reliquary made of the lower jaw and tooth of St. Koloman, not on regular display in the museum are kept safely in the treasury of the Abbey. These three treasures of the abbey are brought out for display to the public once a year on October 13 which is observed as St. Koloman's Day. The Abbey attracts half million visitors annually.

Due to its fame and academic stature, Melk managed to escape dissolution under Emperor Joseph II when many other Austrian abbeys were seized and dissolved between 1780 and 1790. The abbey managed to survive other threats to its existence during the Napoleonic Wars, and also in the period following the Nazi Anschluss that took control of Austria in 1938, when the school and a large part of the abbey were confiscated by the state.

The school was returned to the abbey after the Second World War and now caters for nearly 700 pupils of both sexes and is one of the reputed institutions in Austria.

In the 15th century, the abbey was at the centre of monastic reforms termed as "Melk Reforms". Since 1625, the abbey has been a member of the Austrian Congregation, now within the Benedictine Confederation.

Schallaburg Castle

Schallaburg Castle, located in the municipality of Schollach, is one of the best-known Renaissance style castles in Lower Austria north of the Alps. The central part of the castle was built in the Middle Ages, in 1572, by the Lose Steiner dynasty. It depicts a unique combination of a Romanesque residential castle and the Gothic chapel, patterned on the Italian palazzo style, which was in vogue then. Aesthetically built, it has a well-decorated two-storied arcaded court with elegant cantilevered staircases and a courtyard. The decorations are in terracotta mosaic vividly depicting mythological figures, gods, masks and remarkable human beings and animals; a legendary mythical figurine here is known as "Hundefräulein" (a female human figure with a dog's head). Its culturally rich Mannerist gardens have wide range of roses, ornamental trees and bushes and herbs planted in the gardens in the town, as also two Renaissance apple orchards.

Steiner Tor

Steiner Tor is a-preserved gate in the city of Krems, originally built in the late 15th century but refashioned in the Baroque style. It is considered the symbol of the city. Until the last third of the 19th century, the city of Krems was surrounded by a wall. This was systematically razed, and three gates were also removed. From 2005, celebrating the 700-year anniversary of the city rights, the Steiner Tor was restored as much to its original as possible.

Outside the portal are towers flanking both sides, which, like the lower floor of the gate, date from the late Middle Ages. On the right of the archway is a small stone coat of arms mentioning Emperor Friedrich III, and the year 1480 in Roman numerals. This is believed to date the restoration of the fortifications that had become necessary because of the destruction wrought by Hungarian troops in 1477. The tower building dates from much more recently, and dates to the Baroque period during the reign of Maria Theresa, 1756. Outside the gate, the Steiner Tor was originally threatened by flooding from the Danube. On the inner side of the stone door is a mounted memorial which commemorates such a disaster in 1573. In the immediate vicinity of the Steiner Tor is a shopping centre.

Gothic Piarist church
Gothic Piarist church in Krems was built in 1014. It was refurbished in mid 15th century. Its choir was consecrated in 1457 and later sanctified again in 1508 following the adaptations. Its frescoes and altar are credited to the famous artist Martin Johann Schmidt in Baroque architectural style. The church was also the theological college of the Piarists between 1636 and 1641.

Göttweig Abbey

Göttweig Abbey, a Benedictine monastery near Krems, was founded as a monastery of canons regular by Blessed Altmann, Bishop of Passau. It is also known as the "Austrian Montecassino" named after the original Benedictine monastery in Italy. The high altar of the church was dedicated in 1072, but the monastery itself wasn't founded until 1083: the foundation charter, dated 9 September 1083, is still preserved in the abbey archives.

By 1094 the discipline of the community had become so lax that Bishop Ulrich of Passau, with the permission of Pope Urban II, introduced the Rule of St. Benedict. Prior Hartmann of St. Blaise's Abbey in the Black Forest was elected abbot. He brought with him from St. Blaise's a number of chosen monks, among whom were Blessed Wirnto and Blessed Berthold, later abbots of Formbach and Garsten respectively. Under Hartmann (1094–1114) Göttweig became a famous seat of learning and strict monastic observance. He founded a monastic school, organized a library, and at the foot of the hill built a nunnery where it is believed that Ava, the earliest German-language woman poet known by name (d. 1127), lived as an anchorite. The nunnery, which was afterward transferred to the top of the hill, continued to exist until 1557.

During the 15th and 16th centuries, however, the abbey declined so rapidly that between 1556 and 1564 it had no abbot at all, and in 1564 not a single monk was left here. At this crisis an imperial deputation arrived at Göttweig, and elected Michael Herrlich, a monk of Melk Abbey, as abbot. The new abbot, who held his office until 1604, restored the monastery spiritually and financially, and rebuilt it after it had been almost entirely destroyed by fire in 1580.

Abbots distinguished during the Reformation were George Falb (1612–1631) and David Corner (1631–1648), who successfully opposed the spread of Protestantism in the district.

In 1718, the monastery burnt down and was partially rebuilt on a grander scale during the abbacy of Gottfried Bessel (1714–1749) to designs by Johann Lucas von Hildebrandt inspired by the Escorial, a scheme so lavish that Abbot Gottfried was nearly deposed because of it. The fresco decorating the imperial staircase is considered as a masterpiece of Baroque architecture in Austria. Executed by Paul Troger in 1739, it represents the Holy Roman Emperor Charles VI as Apollo.

The Abbey complex also part of UNESCO Heritage, located on a forested hill, is few miles away from Krems. The church in the complex has two unconventional towers with flat pyramidal shape. There are also four Tuscan columns built between the towers. It is painted in pink on the exterior, while the interiors are painted in gold, brown and blue colours. The altar built in 1639 is impressive and high and has backdrop of glass windows. The casket of abbey's founder, an ornamental organ front dated to 1703, the Altmann Crypt and the choir stalls are also seen behind the altar.

Other notable architectural features seen in the west wing of the abbey are: The three storied Kalserstiege built in 1738, baroque staircases (known as the Imperial Staircase) with the ceiling painted with a fresco by Paul Troger with the theme of Emperor Karl VI's apotheosis (dated 1739). The museum here, which is accommodated in the former chambers of the Emperor and the Prince, holds every year, a vivid display of the abbeys art collections.

The abbey has a library of 130,000 books and manuscripts, and a particularly important collection of religious engravings, besides valuable collections of coins, antiquities, musical manuscripts and natural history, all of which survived the dangers of World War II and its immediate aftermath almost without loss.

Since 1625, the abbey has been a member of the Austrian Congregation, now within the Benedictine Confederation.

Burgruine Aggstein

Burgruine Aggstein is the remnant of a castle on the right bank of the Danube, north of Melk. According to archaeological excavations of the foundations of the castle it has been inferred that the castle was built in the early part of the 12th century. The old name of the castle was Dunkelsteinerwald. The castle was built by the Kuenringer family (famed for their notoriety) by Manegold III Aggsbach Getbeen of the Kuenringer family descent and his son Aggstein Manegold IV inherited it as a fiefdom of Bavaria. They started living in the castle from 1180 CE onwards. Its notoriety was due to the "robber barons" of Schloss Schonbuhel and Burg Agstein" who imprisoned their rivals for ransom and tied them to a rock ledge all the time threatening to kill them by throwing them into the gorge. In 1181, it came into the possession of the Kuenringer Aggsbach-Gansbach. The castle was besieged during the revolt of the Austrian nobility against Duke Albrecht I in 1295/96. Kuenringer Leutold occupied the castle from 1348 to 1355 and then it fell into disrepair.

In 1429, Duke Albrecht V pledged to rebuild the ruined castle because of its strategic position on the Danube. The purpose was to collect taxes from passing boats. In 1438, he built a riverbank toll house to regulate shipping on the Danube and used it as a front to accumulate wealth by robbery from ships. Later, another dishonest baron, Georg von Stain, occupied the castle but in 1476 he was caught and expelled and was forced to surrender the castle. Duke Leopold III took over the castle in 1477. It was occupied with tenants and carers in order to stop the looting which had taken place on the river in previous decades.

In 1529, the castle was burned down by a group of Turks during the first Turkish siege of Vienna. It was rebuilt and provided with loopholes for defence with the help of artillery. In 1606, Anna Baroness acquired the castle, but after her death, the castle was neglected. In 1685, the castle became the property of Count Ernst Rüdiger von Starhemberg. Then in 1819, one of his descendants, Ludwig Josef Gregor von Starhemberg, sold the castle to Count Franz von Beroldingen who renovated the castle in the 19th century.  The Beroldingen family owned the castle until 1930 when the estate and the ruins of Schönbühel Aggstein were sold to Count Oswald von Seilern Aspang.

Schloss Schönbühel

Foreign influence
Related to the Austrian Wachau is the Wachovia area in North Carolina, comprising most of Forsyth County.

See also
List of World Heritage Sites in Austria

References

External links

 Wachau Official Website
Movies and Broadcasts
Winemonger.com article on the Codex Wachau
Vinea Wachau
 Wachau, Weissenkirchen Website
 Wachau, Weissenkirchen Weblog
 Wachauer.Net

Valleys of Lower Austria
World Heritage Sites in Austria
Articles containing video clips
Bohemian Massif